Panobius is a genus of adapiform primate that lived in Asia during the early or middle Eocene.

References

Literature cited

 

Prehistoric strepsirrhines
Eocene primates
Eocene mammals of Asia
†Panobius
Prehistoric primate genera
Fossil taxa described in 1987